Durand may refer to:

Places

United States 
 Durand Township, Winnebago County, Illinois
 Durand, Illinois, a village
 Durand High School (Illinois), a public high school
 Durand, Georgia, an unincorporated community
 Durand, Kansas, an unincorporated community
 Durand, Michigan, a city
 Durand Township, Minnesota
 Durand, Virginia, an unincorporated community
 Durand (town), Wisconsin
 Durand, Wisconsin, a city located within the town

Other 
 Mont Durand, a mountain in Switzerland
 Tvarožná, Kežmarok District (Hungarian: Duránd), Slovakia, a village and municipality
 Durand Line, a poorly marked boundary between Afghanistan and Pakistan
 Durand Airfield, a World War II airfield near Port Moresby, Papua New Guinea
 Durand Stone, a basalt sculpture with cuneiform inscription in Bahrain

People 
 Durand (surname)
 Durand (given name)

Other uses
 Éditions Durand, French music publisher
 Durand baronets, a title in the Baronetage of the United Kingdom
 Hospital Durand, Buenos Aires, Argentina
 Durand Cup, a football tournament in India

See also
 Durán (disambiguation), the Hispanic version of the French surname Durand
 Durant (disambiguation)